Arthur Lee May (born November 16, 1948) is a former American football defensive end who played one season for the New England Patriots. He went to college at Tuskegee.

Early life and education
Art May was born on November 16, 1948 in Bessemer, Alabama. He went to Abrams High School and Tuskegee University. He was named All-Conference in his three years of college football. In his final season, he had 79 tackles and 100 assists.

Professional career
May was drafted in the 5th round (110th overall) by the Cincinnati Bengals. He did not make the roster with the Bengals and instead signed with the New England Patriots. He played in 11 games, starting 5 with the Patriots in his rookie season. He wore number 71. He was injured in pre-season the next year and missed the entire season. While recovering from the injury, May enjoyed sewing. In 1974 he went to the Jacksonville Sharks of the World Football League. The next season he spent with the Chicago Winds. 1975 was his last season.

References

Living people
1948 births
New England Patriots players
Jacksonville Sharks players
Chicago Winds players
Players of American football from Alabama
American football defensive ends
Tuskegee Golden Tigers football players